Gori Chen is a glacier-fed mountain group in the Eastern Himalayas. Peaks include the third highest peak in northeast India. Other peaks include Gorichen II, Gorichen East and Gorichen South.

It is among the mountains of India that is popular for expeditions and trekkers. Gori Chen provided for training to the 19 Kumaon before its deployment in Siachen in the 1980s. Older expeditions passing Gori Chen include the Bailey–Morshead exploration in 1913 and Bill Tilman's expedition in 1939. The Bailey–Morshead exploration in 1913 has inspired a modern Bailey Trail.

Maps

References

Further reading 

 
 
 

Mountains of Arunachal Pradesh
Borders of Arunachal Pradesh